The 1966–67 St. Francis Terriers men's basketball team represented St. Francis College during the 1966–67 NCAA men's basketball season. The team was coached by Daniel Lynch, who was in his nineteenth year at the helm of the St. Francis Terriers. The Terriers played their homes games at the 69th Regiment Armory and were members of the Metropolitan Collegiate Conference.

The Terriers finished the season at 15–8 overall and 7–2 in conference play. They were the Metropolitan Collegiate Conference Co-Champions, Saint Peter's and Manhattan College also produced 7–2 records in the conference. Going into the final week of the regular season, the Terriers, as underdogs and on the road, faced Saint Peter's, which was selected for the 1967 NIT.  The Terriers were able to defeat Saint Peter's and produce the three-way tie for first place in the MCC.

Against Siena on January 7, Alan Fisher set the Terrier record for most points in a game with 42. Then on February 10, also against Siena, Fisher set a new record with 44 points.

Roster

Schedule and results

|-
!colspan=12 style="background:#0038A8; border: 2px solid #CE1126;;color:#FFFFFF;"| Regular Season

References

St. Francis Brooklyn Terriers men's basketball seasons
1966–67 Metropolitan Collegiate Conference men's basketball season
Saint Francis
Saint Francis